Lieutenant General Andrew Gordon (died 17 April 1806) was a British Army officer who became Lieutenant Governor of Jersey.

Early life 

He was a son of James Gordon of Ellon, Aberdeenshire and Elizabeth Glen, the latter being a sister of James Glen, governor of South Carolina. His brother was Lieutenant Colonel James Gordon.

Military career 

Born in Scotland, Gordon became a major in the 26th Regiment of Foot in 1777. He was promoted to lieutenant-colonel in 1784, colonel in 1790, major-general in 1794, and lieutenant-general in 1801 (from brevet, 1799). He was appointed Lieutenant Governor of Jersey in 1797 and died in office in 1806.

He was also Colonel of the 89th Regiment of Foot from 1795 to 1797, the 59th Regiment of Foot from 1797 to 1801 and Colonel of the 26th Regiment of Foot from 1801 to his death in 1806.

References

Further reading 

|-

1806 deaths
British Army lieutenant generals
Cameronians officers
59th Regiment of Foot officers
Governors of Jersey
Royal Irish Fusiliers officers
Year of birth missing